The Grass Is Greener is a 1960 film starring Cary Grant.

The Grass Is Greener may also refer to:

 The Grass Is Greener (play), a 1956 play by Hugh and Margaret Williams; basis for the 1960 film
 Grass Is Greener, a 2019 documentary film
 The Grass Is Greener (festival), an annual Australian music festival
 The Grass Is Greener (album) or the title song, by Colosseum, 1970
 "The Grass Is Greener" (song), by Brenda Lee, 1963